Ahmed Hassan Gabobe is a Somali politician. He belongs to the Bimal subclan of the Dir. He is the Minister of Justice and Religious Affairs of Somalia, having been appointed to the position on 27 January 2015 by Prime Minister Omar Abdirashid Ali Sharmarke.

References

Living people
Government ministers of Somalia
Year of birth missing (living people)